The Russian Naval General Staff was created on 7 May 1906 by Tsar Nicholai II from the existing Research Unit of the Main Naval Staff after the Russo-Japanese War. Its mission was to formulate war plans and to decide the characteristics of new ships as the Main Naval Staff was too occupied with day-to-day matters. Its first head was Captain 1st Rank L. A. Brusilov, brother of General Aleksei Brusilov, and it initially was composed of only 15 officers. By the beginning of World War I it had expanded to 40 officers. It was disbanded by the Bolsheviks when they seized power in 1917.

Notes

References

Bibliography
 

Imperial Russian Navy
Navy
Staff (military)
1906 establishments in the Russian Empire